Sri Lankan Malay (also known as Sri Lankan Creole Malay, Bahasa Melayu, Ja basawa and Java mozhi) is a creole language spoken in Sri Lanka, formed as a mixture of Sinhala and Shonam (Sri Lanka Muslim Tamil), with Malay being the major lexifier. It is traditionally spoken by the Sri Lankan Malays and among some Sinhalese in Hambantota. Today, the number of speakers of the language have dwindled considerably but it has continued to be spoken notably in the Hambantota District of Southern Sri Lanka, which has traditionally been home to many Sri Lankan Malays.

History 
During the 17th and 18th centuries, the Dutch who had occupied Batavia of Java exiled native rebels and royalty to Sri Lanka, and they made their first settlements in Hambantota and Kirinde. Later on, the Dutch also garrisoned their military, composed of Malays, in other parts of Sri Lanka. As a result, some scholars even believe that SLM is closely associated with the Batavian dialect of Malay. Others have proposed that Sri Lankan Malay originates from eastern Indonesia, based on similarities with Manado Malay and North Moluccan Malay (Ternate Malay).

Today, Sri Lankan Malay (SLM), is spoken in the Central (Kandy), Southern (Hambantota and Kirinde) and Western (Slave Island) provinces of the country. The Malay population living in Kinniya and Mutur no longer speak Malay and have resorted to either Sri Lankan Tamil or Sri Lankan Moor Tamil (SLMT). The majority of the speakers today reside in Northern Colombo. The exact number of speakers is unknown and there are no linguistic statistics available on the number of speakers living in or outside of Sri Lanka. Based on the ethnic statistics of Sri Lankan Malays, the estimation of the number of Sri Lankan Malay speakers is probably between 30,000 and 40,000.

Variation 
As the language has been influenced by Sinhala, Tamil and English, SLM speakers constantly code-switch between SLM and either one or two of the other mentioned languages. As a result, SLM within the three mentioned provinces, have taken a distinctive character of their own. Sebastian Nydorf has produced “A Grammar of Upcountry Malay” highlighting the said regional variations, however, his efforts have been criticised for having widening disparities within the language. Due to these differences, there are contesting opinions among the SLM speakers themselves: while some speakers say that Malay in Kirinde and Hambantota is of higher status due to its closeness to archaic Malay, others claim that Malay of Slave Island is more vibrant in its evolution, especially in its use of slang which has even been adopted by the Moors. A result of this variation within spoken SLM is a call for standardisation in the written variety, following Bahasa Kumpulan (standardised Malay in Malaysia and Indonesia).

Malays who first arrived in Sri Lanka, keeping with their customs and practices, used the gundul alphabet for writing, which was the Arabic script with five additional letters. This practice had survived until the mid-1940s, and had only been used among specific individuals (such as religious/communal figures) and served limited and exclusive purposes as a minority language within the country. For instance, Malay bills of marriage (kavin) were drawn in gundul. Presently, however, both “Standard Malay” (SM) and SLM use the Romanised script for writing purposes. Some of the advocates of the Romanised script claim that using English following (their interpretation of) Standard British English must be the only way of writing Malay. For instance, using ‘ch’ instead of the letter ‘c’ for the /ch/ sound (failing to realise that ‘ch’ could also produce the /k/ sound). Other users and scholars of SLM claim that Sinhala, being a phonetical alphabet, would be better suited for writing Malay as it would better capture Malay pronunciation. Much studies have not been done on the particular variety of SLM  but there are debates that SLM is endangered. “ Much work remains to be done on the various varieties of SLM”. In Colombo community, parents encourage their children to speak in English therefore SLM is endangered in that community . Concerning the Cosmopolitan Colombo community, where the level of education is high, the community typically shows strong linguistic vitality in SLM in the oldest to middle generations and rapidly decreasing linguistic competence (to nil) in the vernacular in the young generation. In sharp contrast is the speech community of Kirinda, with low education and employment levels who still have SLM as a dominant language. The current thrust in the SLM community is that some segments of the community especially those in Kirinda, believe that SLM language must be encouraged, taught, and strengthened while others in the Colombo community believe that Malaysian or Indonesian Malay should be taught as means of revitalising SLM by converging it with a more standardised variety. The Kirinda community in Hambantota is one of the few communities that speak Sri Lankan Malay as their dominant language. Although children in the Kirinda community remain, monolingual speakers of Sri Lankan Malay, before they enter primary school, the speakers of Sri Lankan Malay today are insufficient to maintain the language in future generations. In some communities, Sri Lankan Malay is clearly endangered but there is a debate about whether it is endangered overall since some communities have robust first language speakers.

Trilingualism is achieved by the SLM community due to contact with the larger group of Tamil and the majority of Sinhalese speakers because Sinhala and Tamil were adstrates.  Therefore, the restructuring process that occurs in SLM has several grammatical categories that are absent from other Malay varieties, but are found in both Sinhala and Tamil. Considering that mixed languages typically show lexical items predominantly from one source, and grammatical material predominantly from another, the SLM lexicon is primarily of PMD origin while grammatical features are derived from Sinhala and Tamil. Therefore, the use of inflections  is largely due to a process of typological congruence of Lankan adstrates. Dative and accusative are marked by suffixes attached to a noun (naƞ-DAT yaƞ-ACC). The verb-final order follows the Sinhala and Tamil typology. This is illustrated as follows:

ni   aanak-naƞ       baek     buku-yaƞ  attu       aada

This student-DAT  good     book-ACC   one    exist

“This student has a good book.”

As in Tamil, accusative tends to mark definiteness in SLM.

Inni   kendera -yaƞ        bapi

This chair-ACC takes. go

“Take this chair away.”

A direct influence of Sinhala is seen in Ablative syncretism marker  (to indicate source) riɧ.

Market-riƞ   ais-tra    baaru   ikkaƞ  billi      bawa

Market-ABL ice-NEG new    fish     buy     bring

Get me some fresh fish from the market

The SLM possessive case suffix is ‘pe’, derived form of Malaya punya “to possess” distinguishes a feature of contact Malay varieties such as Bazaar Malay and Baba Malay.

goppe tumman go-yaƞ e-tolak

My friend pushed me

As an archaic feature of Malay lingua franca, it is most likely that this feature was maintained from the original varieties of the SLM community and its adaptation led to the development of a new case that distinguishes SLM from its adstrates.

References

Further reading
 
Ansaldo, U. 2008 Sri Lanka Malay revisited: Genesis and classification. In A. Dwyer, D. Harrison & D. Rood (eds). A world of many voices: Lessons from documented endangered languages. Typological Studies in Language 78. Amsterdam/ Philadelphia: John Benjamins. 13–42.
Ansaldo, U., & Lim, L. L. S. (2006). "Globalisation, empowerment and the periphery: The Malays of Sri Lanka." in R. Elangaiyan, R. McKenna Brown, N. D. M. Ostler, & M. K. Verma (eds.), Vital Voices: Endangered Languages and Multilingualism, pp. 39–46. Foundation for Endangered Languages & Central Institute of Indian Languages.
de Silva Jayasuriya, Shihan. 2002. Sri Lankan Malay: A unique creole. In Tadmor, Uri (ed.), Studies in Malay Dialects: Part III, 43–59. Jakarta: Universitas Atma Jaya.
Hussainmiya, B. A. n.d. Sri Lankan Malay Language: Some Preliminary. In.
Keeping Kirinda vital: The endangerment-empowerment dilemma in the documentation of Sri Lanka Malay ( pp. 51–66 ) . Lim, Lisa and Ansaldo, Umberto (2006) · ACLC Working Papers. 1
Nordhoff, Sebastian. 2007. Vowel quantity in Sri Lanka Malay. (paper presented at the Joint Summer Meeting of the SPCL and the ACBLPE).
 
 
Robuchon, G. 2003. Malayo Language in Sri Lanka. (Paper presented at the 7th International Symposium on the Malay/Indonesian Linguistics in Berg en Dal).
Ronit, R. (n.d.). Cross-Cultural Influences on the Language of the Sri Lankan Malays.
Slomanson, Peter. 2004. The syntax of tense and aspect in Sri Lankan Malay. (Paper presented at the SPCL summer meeting, Cura& cedil;cao Creole conference 2004, August 11–15, Cura& cedil;cao).
Slomanson, Peter. 2013. Sri Lankan Malay. In: Michaelis, Susanne Maria & Maurer, Philippe & Haspelmath, Martin & Huber, Magnus (eds.) The survey of pidgin and creole languages. Volume 3: Contact Languages Based on Languages from Africa, Asia, Australia, and the Americas. Oxford: Oxford University Press.

External links
 Sri Lankan Creole Malay profile at the Endangered Languages Project

Languages of Sri Lanka
Sri Lankan Malays
Malay-based pidgins and creoles